Joseph Edmondson Reid (born  March 18, 1929) was an American football linebacker who played for the Los Angeles Rams and Dallas Texans. He played college football at Louisiana State University, having previously attended Meridian High School.  He would later receive an MBA from Harvard Business School.

References

1929 births
Living people
American football linebackers
LSU Tigers football players
Los Angeles Rams players
Dallas Texans (NFL) players
Players of American football from Mississippi
Sportspeople from Meridian, Mississippi
Harvard Business School alumni